Foxhall Alexander Parker Jr. (August 5, 1821 – June 10, 1879) was an officer in the United States Navy during the American Civil War and became one of the founders of the United States Naval Institute.

Biography
He was born in New York on August 5, 1821, the son of Foxhall A. Parker Sr. and Sarah Jay Bogardus (born 1794), daughter of Robert Bogardus (1771–1841).

Parker was appointed a midshipman March 11, 1837. He was attached to the West Indian Squadron, then transferred to the Philadelphia Naval School, graduating in 1843. In 1842, he served under his father, Foxhall A. Parker Sr., in Constitution. He also served under his father in Brandywine. On September 21, 1850, he was commissioned lieutenant. He served against the Florida Indians, on the Great Lakes, the Mediterranean, the Pacific, and on various coast surveys.

From 1861 to 1862, he was executive officer of the navy yard at Washington, D.C. During the Civil War, he cooperated with the Army of the Potomac, protecting Alexandria, Virginia, after the First Battle of Bull Run. His capable manipulation of the forces at his command went far toward restoring order and confidence at Washington. He built Fort Dahlgren, and drilled 2,000 seamen in the exercise of artillery and small arms, thereby promoting the success of Admiral Andrew H. Foote's operations with the Mississippi Flotilla.

He became commander on July 16, 1862, had charge of the steam gunboat Mahaska in active service off Wilmington and Yorktown, and of the gunboat Wabash off Charleston from June to September 1863. He commanded a naval battery at the bombardment of Fort Sumter. Later, until the close of the war, he commanded the Potomac Flotilla, which consisted at one time of 42 vessels, and frequently engaged Confederate forces.

In 1866, he received the rank of captain. In 1872, as commodore and chief of staff of the North Atlantic Fleet, he drew up a code of signals for steam tactics.  In 1877/8 he was in charge of the Boston Navy Yard. He became superintendent of the United States Naval Academy in 1878 and was one of the founders of the United States Naval Institute.

Parker died at Annapolis, Maryland.  His brother was William Harwar Parker, who served in the U.S. Navy and in the Confederate States Navy.

Writings
Textbooks for the U.S. Naval Academy:
 Fleet Tactics Under Steam (1863)
 Squadron Tactics under Steam (1863)
 The Naval Howitzer Afloat (1865)
 The Naval Howitzer Ashore (1865)
History:
 The Fleets of the World: the Galley Period (1876)
 The Battle of Mobile Bay (1878)

Namesakes
Two ships have been named USS Parker for him.

See also
 List of Superintendents of the United States Naval Academy

Notes

References

 
 
 
 
 Photo of Parker

External links

 Parker, Foxhall A. (Foxhall Alexander) 1821-1879 (Worldcat Identities)

1821 births
1879 deaths
United States Navy officers
Union Navy officers
Military personnel from New York City
People of New York (state) in the American Civil War
United States Navy commodores
Superintendents of the United States Naval Academy